Acanthosaura murphyi is a species of agama found in Vietnam.

References

murphyi
Reptiles of Vietnam
Reptiles described in 2018
Taxa named by Luan Thanh Nguyen
Taxa named by Truong Quang Nguyen
Taxa named by Nikolai Loutseranovitch Orlov
Taxa named by Vu Dang Hoang Nguyen
Taxa named by Sang Ngoc Nguyen